Clinton Bowen Fisk (December 8, 1828 - July 9, 1890) was a senior officer during Reconstruction in the Bureau of Refugees, Freedmen and Abandoned Lands and served as the Prohibition Party's presidential candidate during the 1888 presidential election. Fisk University was named in his honor after he endowed it with $30,000. In addition, he helped establish the first free public schools in the Southern United States for white and African-American children.

Life

Early life

Clinton Bowen Fisk was born on December 8, 1828 in York, Livingston County, New York to Benjamin Bigford Fisk and Lydia Aldrich Powell. As part of the 19th-century westward migration, his family soon moved to Coldwater, Michigan. He studied in the preliminary course at Albion Seminary before becoming one of the five students to matriculate on the opening day of Michigan Central College in 1844. Fisk later became a merchant, miller, and banker in Coldwater, but suffered financial disaster in the Panic of 1857. In 1859 he moved to St. Louis, Missouri where he started working in the insurance business.

Civil War

After the start of the Civil War Fisk joined the Union Army in 1861 as a private and was appointed colonel of the 33rd Missouri Volunteer Infantry of the Union Army on September 5, 1862. He was later commissioned as brigadier general in charge of a brigade on November 24, 1862 and also served on Major General George Armstrong Custer's staff. He served most of the American Civil War in Missouri and Arkansas, commanding first the District of Southeast Missouri and later the Department of North Missouri to opposing raids into Missouri by Confederate cavalry and guerrillas. In 1865 he was promoted to brevet major general.

Freedmen's Bureau and Fisk University

After the Civil War, Fisk was appointed assistant commissioner of the Freedmen's Bureau for Kentucky and Tennessee under the command of Oliver Otis Howard.  He worked through the Bureau of Refugees, Freedmen and Abandoned Lands and the American Missionary Association to establish the first free schools in the American South for both black and white children. He made the abandoned barracks in Nashville, Tennessee available to the American Missionary Association for the creation of the Fisk School, and endowed it with a total of $30,000.

Politics

After authorizing legislation expired for the Freedmen's Bureau, Fisk returned to his native New York where he returned to banking. In 1874 President Ulysses S. Grant appointed him to the Board of Indian Commissioners. 

He was a zealous leader of the prohibition movement. In 1886 he ran for governor of New Jersey with the Prohibition nomination. During the 1888 presidential election he served the Prohibition Party's presidential nominee after being given the nomination by acclamation on June 6, 1888. He was accused of being a possible spoiler candidate that would prevent Benjamin Harrison from winning like John St. John had been accused of in 1884. Harrison won the election although without winning the national popular vote. "General," said one Republican to Fisk, "if I should vote for this [prohibition] bill it would lay me in my political grave." "Vote for it and die, then," Fisk responded, "and I will write on your tombstone, 'Blessed are the dead that die in the Lord'"

Death and legacy

Fisk died in New York City on July 9, 1890, from influenza and was buried in Coldwater, Michigan. Prohibition Park, a planned community on Staten Island, New York, named one of its major streets Clinton B. Fisk Avenue in his honor.  The name remains, although the community changed its name to Westerleigh. In 2001 he was the first to be inducted into the new Hillsdale County, Michigan Veterans' Hall of Fame, for his distinguished service in the American Civil War. (Hall of Fame inductee 001, Civil War inductee 001.)

Electoral history

See also
List of American Civil War generals (Union)

References

Further reading
 Alphonso A. Hopkins, The Life of Clinton Bowen Fisk (1882) online
 Reavis L. Mitchell Jr., Fisk University Since 1866: Thy Loyal Children Make Their Way (1995).

External links

Clinton B. Fisk Tennessee Encyclopedia of History and Culture

1828 births
1890 deaths
People from York, New York
People of Missouri in the American Civil War
People of New York (state) in the American Civil War
Union Army generals
Hillsdale College alumni
American temperance activists
New York (state) Prohibitionists
New Jersey Prohibitionists
Missouri Prohibitionists
Prohibition Party (United States) presidential nominees
Candidates in the 1888 United States presidential election